Below are the full rosters and coaching staff of the 15 teams of Frontier League.

East Division

New Jersey Jackals

New York Boulders

Ottawa Titans

Québec Capitales

Sussex County Miners

Trois-Rivières Aigles

Tri-City ValleyCats

West Division

Evansville Otters

Florence Y'alls

Gateway Grizzlies

Joliet Slammers

Lake Erie Crushers

Schaumburg Boomers

Washington Wild Things

Windy City ThunderBolts

External links
 Official website

Independent League team rosters